Marcel Fischbach (22 August 1914 – 27 June 1980) was a Luxembourgish politician, journalist, and diplomat.  He held the position of Minister for Defence in the second cabinet of Pierre Werner.

From 1939, he wrote for d'Wort, a daily newspaper.  After the Second World War, Fischbach sat in both the Chamber of Deputies (1945 – 1958 and 1959 – 1964) and Luxembourg City's Luxembourg communal council (1945 – 1964).  On 15 July 1964, he became Minister for Defence.  During this time, Fischbach was responsible for the reduction of national service from nine months to six months.  However, a political crisis erupted in late 1966 over the final transformation of the Luxembourgian army into an all-volunteer force, over which Fischbach resigned from the cabinet, and retired from politics, on 3 January 1967.

After his resignation, Fischbach became a senior diplomat, serving as Ambassador to Austria (1967 – 1973), Ambassador to Belgium (1973 – 1977), and Ambassador to Germany (1977 – 1979).

Marcel's son, Marc Fischbach, would also go on to serve as Minister for Defence (1984 – 1989).

|-

Ministers for Defence of Luxembourg
Councillors in Luxembourg City
Christian Social People's Party politicians
Luxembourgian diplomats
Luxembourgian journalists
Male journalists
Luxemburger Wort people
1914 births
1980 deaths
People from Luxembourg City
Permanent Representatives of Luxembourg to NATO
Ambassadors of Luxembourg to Austria
Ambassadors of Luxembourg to Belgium
Ambassadors of Luxembourg to Germany
20th-century journalists